Salingyi Township  is a township in Yinmabin District in the Sagaing Division of Myanmar. The principal town is Salingyi.

Over  of farmland have been confiscated in the township to establish a copper mine in Letpadaung, which will be jointly owned by the Union of Myanmar Economic Holdings (UMEHL) and the Chinese-owned Wenbao Copper Company, a subsidiary of Norinco.

References

External links
Maplandia World Gazetteer - map showing the township boundary

Townships of Sagaing Region